USS Pledge (MSO-492) was an Aggressive-class minesweeper acquired by the U.S. Navy.

The second ship to be named Pledge by the Navy, MSO-492, a minesweeper, was laid down on 24 June 1954 by the J. M. Martinac Shipbuilding Corp., Tacoma, Washington, launched 20 July 1955, sponsored by Mrs. T. F. Uitsch, and commissioned 20 April 1956.

West Coast operations 

After sea trials, Pledge joined her sister ships at Long Beach, California, 25 May 1956. Following training from July 1956 to February 1957 she operated in WESTPAC March to September 1957. She underwent modification from October 1957 to March 1958. In May-June of 1958
the Pledge participated in training exercises with Canadian minesweepers off the coast of Vancouver Island near Cook Inlet.  September of 1959 the Pledge and the other four ships in her division (the Esteem, Gallant and two others) again deployed to Sasebo Japan.  Enroute, carrying the division doctor, the Pledge was detached to rendezvous with a submarine where a high line transfer of the doctor was completed (and returned after diagnosing a submariner with appendicitis).

Vietnam operations 

Deployed to WESTPAC 24 August 1961, she visited Bangkok, Thailand, in November, and Saigon, Vietnam, in December. In early 1962 she participated in special training operations at Da Nang, Vietnam until her departure 17 February. Her deployment to WESTPAC, 12 August 1963 included exercises with South Korean ships in October and Nationalist Chinese ships in November. On her next assignment to WESTPAC, 13 August 1965, She performed coastal surveillance duties off the Republic of Vietnam from 18 October to 16 November 1965 and from 18 December into early 1966.

Into 1970 Pledge remained active with the U.S. Pacific Fleet.

Decommissioning 

Decommissioned and stricken 31 January 1994, Pledge was sold to Taiwan on 8 March of that year.

References

External links 

 NavSource Online: Mine Warfare Vessel Photo Archive - Pledge (MSO-492) - ex-AM-492

Aggressive-class minesweepers
Ships built in Tacoma, Washington
1955 ships
Cold War minesweepers of the United States
Vietnam War minesweepers of the United States
Yung Yang-class minesweepers
Minesweepers of the Republic of China